Sergei Fyodorovich Puponov (born 8 April 1982) is a former Russian football player.

Puponov made a single appearance in the Russian Premier League with FC Saturn Ramenskoye.

References

1982 births
Living people
Russian footballers
FC Saturn Ramenskoye players
Russian Premier League players
Association football midfielders